Varnavino is an urban locality (a work settlement) and the administrative center of Varnavinsky District in Nizhny Novgorod Oblast, Russia, located on the Vetluga River. Population:

References

Urban-type settlements in Nizhny Novgorod Oblast
Varnavinsky District
Varnavinsky Uyezd